Sharon Rooney (born ) is a Scottish actress. She is known for her roles as Rae Earl in My Mad Fat Diary, Sophie in Two Doors Down, Dawn in Brief Encounters, and Miss Atlantis in the 2019 remake of Dumbo.

Early life
Rooney was born in Glasgow. She left school at the age of 16 to pursue a career in acting, and enrolled on a 3-year performing arts course followed by a degree in drama at Hull University.

Career
Rooney began performing stand-up comedy, and toured with a play in various schools across Britain. Her first television role came when she was cast as Rae Earl, a young woman who is released from a psychiatric facility after four months, in the E4 teen comedy-drama series My Mad Fat Diary (2013–2015). The show was a success and earned Rooney a BAFTA nomination at the British Academy Scotland Awards. The Guardians Sam Wollaston called Rooney's performance "natural, effortless and utterly believable". The role also saw her nominated for a Royal Television Society award in 2014. She was also nominated in the Entertainment category at the 2014 Young Scot Awards.

Rooney played a small part in the Sherlock episode "The Empty Hearse" in 2014. In July 2016, she appeared in the ITV drama series Brief Encounters, set in 1982 and revolving around four women who become involved in Ann Summers party planning. She played Miss Atlantis in the 2019 film Dumbo, in which she performed the song "Baby Mine". She played Nicola Walsh in Finding Alice in 2021.

Filmography

Film

Television

Awards and nominations

References

External links

Scottish television actresses
Scottish film actresses
Scottish stage actresses
Year of birth missing (living people)
Living people
21st-century Scottish actresses
1980s births
Actors from Glasgow